Santa Coloma d'Andorra, also known as Santa Coloma, is an Andorran town in the parish of Andorra la Vella, located near the Gran Valira river and 2 km away from the capital, Andorra la Vella.

Geography
To its west are the mountain villages of Aixàs, Bixessarri, and Canòlic in Andorra, and Os de Civís in Spain.

Notable buildings
It houses a historic church that was nominated as a UNESCO World Heritage site on 22 February 1999 in the Cultural category.

See also

La Margineda

References

Populated places in Andorra
Geography of Andorra la Vella